The Slovenia men's national under-20 basketball team is the representative for Slovenia in international under-20 basketball competitions, and it is organized and run by the Basketball Federation of Slovenia (Košarkarska zveza Slovenije). The Slovenia under-20 national basketball team represents Slovenia at the FIBA U20 European Championship.

Competitive record

FIBA U20 European Championship

FIBA Under-21 World Championship

Note: The FIBA Under-21 World Championship was a men's under-21 basketball competition organized by FIBA. It discontinued in 2005.

Team

Past rosters
1994 Europe Under-22 Championship: finished 8th among 12 teams4.Gorazd Murovec, 5.Radoslav Nesterović, 6.Marko Milič, 7.Aleš Kunc, 8.Radovan Trifunović, 9.Miha Šetina, 10.Klemen Zaletel, 11.Marko Tušek, 12.Slavko Duščak, 13.Boris Gorenc, 14.Luka Jovanovič, 15.Matjaž Cizej (Coach: Lado Gorjan)

1996 Europe Under-22 Championship: finished 7th among 12 teams4.Igor Thaler, 5.Ervin Dragšič, 6.Boštjan Nachbar, 7.Rajmond Rituper, 8.Miloš Šporar, 9.Goran Jagodnik, 10.Slavko Duščak, 11.Marko Tušek, 12.Marko Milič, 13.Gregor Hafnar, 14.Dragiša Drobnjak, 15.Radoslav Nesterović (Coach: Andrej Urlep)

1998 Europe Under-22 Championship: finished 3rd among 12 teams4.Goran Jurak, 5.Jaka Lakovič, 6.Primož Kobale, 7.Marko Verginella, 8.Matjaž Smodiš, 9.Gregor Hafnar, 10.Miloš Šporar, 11.Marko Maravič, 12.Pavel Djurković, 13.Ernest Novak, 14.Dragiša Drobnjak, 15.Primož Brezec (Coach: Zoran Martič)

2000 Europe Under-20 Championship: finished 1st among 12 teams4.Elvis Kadić, 5.Igor Jokić, 6.Primož Brolih, 7.Sani Bečirović, 8.Milan Klepo, 9.Miha Kobe, 10.Matic Vidic, 11.Davorin Škornik, 12.Željko Zagorac, 13.Smiljan Pavič, 14.Miha Zalokar, 15.Boštjan Nachbar (Coach: Zoran Martič)

2001 Under-21 World Championship: finished 6th among 12 teams4.Sašo Ožbolt, 5.Nebojša Joksimović, 6.Primož Brolih, 7.Marko Antonijevič, 8.Milan Klepo, 9.Dragan Miletić, 10.Igor Jokić, 11.Željko Zagorac, 12.Boštjan Nachbar, 13.Smiljan Pavič, 14.Davorin Škornik, 15.Erazem Lorbek (Coach: Zoran Martič)

2002 Europe Under-20 Championship: finished 6th among 12 teams4.Nejc Strnad, 5.Uroš Slokar, 6.Aleksandar Vujačić, 7.Domen Lorbek, 8.Igor Ivaškovič, 9.Beno Udrih, 10.Marino Buršić, 11.Saša Zagorac, 12.Miha Zupan, 13.Aleksandar Ćapin, 14.Saša Mučič, 15.Erazem Lorbek (Coach: Memi Bečirović)

2004 Europe Under-20 Championship: finished 1st among 12 teams4.Jure Močnik, 5.Žan Vrečko, 6.Domen Lorbek, 7.Matej Venta, 8.Miha Fon, 9.Dane Dmitrović, 10.Goran Dragić, 11.Saša Zagorac, 12.Mensud Julević, 13.Stanko Sebič, 14.Hasan Rizvić, 15.Erazem Lorbek (Coach: Ivan Sunara)

2005 Europe Under-20 Championship: finished 10th among 16 teams4.Boris Jeršin, 5.Žan Vrečko, 6.Marko Marković, 7.Jan Rozman, 8.Mirza Begić, 9.Goran Dragić, 10.Sanel Bajramlić, 11.Luka Marolt, 12.Sandi Čebular, 13.Nebojša Čukovič, 14.Jure Močnik, 15.Blaž Črešnar (Coach: Miro Alilović)

2005 Under-21 World Championship: finished 8th among 12 teams4.Žan Vrečko, 5.Aljaž Urbanc, 6.Žiga Zagorc, 7.Blaž Črešnar, 8.Miha Fon, 9.Matej Venta, 10.Goran Dragić, 11.Saša Zagorac, 12.Mensud Julević, 13.Domen Lorbek, 14.Hasan Rizvić, 15.Stanko Sebič (Coach: Ivan Perica)

2006 Europe Under-20 Championship: finished 3rd among 16 teams4.Luka Ambrož, 5.Emir Preldžić, 7.Nejc Glavaš, 8.Jaka Klobučar, 9.Rok Perko, 10.Dejan Hohler, 11.Gašper Vidmar, 13.Matej Krušič, 14.Aljoša Remus, 15.Drago Brčina (Coach: Miro Alilović)

2007 Europe Under-20 Championship: finished 5th among 16 teams4.Rok Perko, 5.Emir Preldžić, 6.Aljoša Krišto, 7.Jan Močnik, 8.Jaka Klobučar, 9.Dejan Mlakar, 10.Klemen Lorbek, 11.Drago Brčina, 12.Tadej Koštomaj, 13.Matej Krušič, 14.Dejan Čigoja, 15.Gašper Vidmar (Coach: Miro Alilović)

2008 Europe Under-20 Championship: finished 14th among 16 teams4.Matija Trampuš, 5.Jakob Virk, 6.Boban Tomić, 7.Luka Lapornik, 8.Mirko Mulalić, 9.Daniel Vujasinović, 10.Ilija Gavrić, 11.Siniša Bilić, 12.Klemen Muha, 13.Zoran Dragić, 14.Dejan Čigoja, 15.Edin Alispahić (Coach: Miro Alilović)

2009 Europe Under-20 Championship: finished 13th among 16 teams4.Uroš Zadnik, 5.Maj Kovačevič, 6.Brane Lekić, 7.Žiga Percel, 8.Dino Murić, 9.Daniel Vujasinović, 10.Zoran Dragić, 11.Marko Vranjković, 12.Željko Jotić, 13.Blaž Mahkovic, 14.Luka Dimec, 15.Jaka Blažič (Coach: Rade Mijanović)

2010 Europe Under-20 Championship: finished 12th among 16 teams4.Uroš Zadnik, 5.Mirza Sarajlija, 6.Brane Lekić, 7.Nejc Kobal, 8.Dino Murić, 9.Jure Pelko, 10.Jakob Čebašek, 11.Marko Vranjković, 12.Edo Murić, 13.Blaž Mahkovic, 14.Luka Dimec, 15.Nejc Buda (Coach: Rade Mijanović)

2011 Europe Under-20 Championship: finished 11th among 16 teams4.Klemen Prepelič, 5.Žan Jerman, 6.Jaka Brodnik, 7.Mitja Nikolić, 8.Edo Murić, 9.Tadej Ferme, 10.Jan Špan, 11.Alen Omić, 12.Marko Pajić, 13.Aljaž Korošeč, 14.Jure Besedić (Coach: Rade Mijanović)

2012 Europe Under-20 Championship: finished 7th among 16 teams4.Jan Špan, 5.Luka Rupnik, 6.Jaka Brodnik, 7.Klemen Prepelič, 8.Jure Besedić, 9.Miha Vašl, 10.Alen Omić, 11.Matej Rojc, 12.Marko Pajić, 13.Miha Lapornik, 14.Žiga Dimec, 15.Gezim Morina (Coach: Zmago Sagadin)

2013 Europe Under-20 Championship: finished 10th among 20 teams4.Aleksander Tomić, 5.Luka Rupnik, 6.Matej Rojc, 7.Gregor Hrovat, 8.Domen Bratož, 9.Erjon Kastrati, 10.Žiga Fifolt, 11.Matej Mežan, 12.Žiga Dimec, 13.Miha Lapornik, 14.Matic Maček, 15.Tomaž Bolčina (Coach: Damjan Novaković)

2014 Europe Under-20 Championship: finished 12th among 20 teams4.Aleksej Nikolić, 5.Erjon Kastrati, 6.Žiga Zatežič, 7.Jan Rizman, 8.Luka Kokol, 9.Matic Rebec, 10.Jan Dolenšek, 11.Jure Ritlop, 12.Jakob Stražar, 13.David Gabrovšek, 14.Sedin Karavdić, 15.Tomaž Bolčina (Coach: Damjan Novaković)

2015 Europe Under-20 Championship: finished 13th among 20 teams4.Jure Špan, 5.Aleksej Nikolić, 6.Domen Janc, 7.Vlatko Čančar, 8.Luka Kokol, 9.Blaž Mesiček, 10.Leon Šantelj, 11.Matic Grušovnik, 12.Jan Kosi, 13.Jure Ritlop, 14.Jan Barbarič, 15.Sedin Karavdić (Coach: Damjan Novaković)

2016 Europe Under-20 Championship: finished 9th among 16 teams4.Žan Mark Šiško, 5.Aljaž Marinč, 6.Grega Sajevic, 7.Vlatko Čančar, 8.Luka Kraljević, 9.Sandi Grubelič, 10.Urban Durnik, 11.Nejc Martinčič, 12.Nejc Zupan, 13.Jan Kosi, 14.Gaber Ožegovič, 15.Žiga Habat (Coach: Aleksander Sekulić)

2017 Europe Under-20 Championship: finished 14th among 16 teams4.Urban Oman, 5.Urban Durnik, 6.Jernej Ledl, 7.Aljaž Bratec, 8.Žiga Habat, 9.Nejc Barič, 10.Matic Vesel, 11.Nejc Martinčič, 12.Žan Mark Šiško, 13.Luka Rožanc, 14.Matevž Mlakar, 15.Jurij Macura (Coach: Aleksander Sekulić)

2018 Europe Under-20 Championship Division B: finished 2nd among 22 teams4.Gaber Ožegovič, 5.David Zajc, 6.Jan Strmčnik, 7.Jan Dornik, 8.Miha Škedelj, 9.Aljaž Bratec, 10.Urban Oman, 11.Jurij Macura, 12.Matic Vesel, 13.Žiga Jurček, 14.Jakov Stipaničev, 15.Denis Alibegović (Coach: Dalibor Damjanović)

2019 Europe Under-20 Championship : finished 11th among 16 teams4.Jakob Strel, 5.Jernej Andolšek Heine, 6.Miha Škedelj, 7.Nejc Klavžar, 8.Adrian Jogan, 9.Adrian Hirschmann, 10.Jure Ličen, 11.Jakov Stipaničev, 12.Stefan Tovilovič, 13.David Kralj, 14.Tim Tomažič, 15.Leon Stergar (Coach: Dejan Jakara)

2021 FIBA U20 European Challengers : finished 1st among 6 teams4.Rok Radović, 5.Luka Ščuka, 6.Bine Prepelič, 7.Gregor Glas, 8.Rok Nemanič, 9.Andrej Stavrov, 10.Dan Duščak, 11.Uroš Šikanić, 12.Primož Kmetić, 13.Robert Jurković, 14.Jan Copot, 15.Klemen Smrekar (Coach: Dejan Jakara)

2022 Europe Under-20 Championship : finished 10th among 16 teams4.Matej Čibej, 5.Luka Ščuka, 6.Lovro Urbiha, 7.Tibor Mirtič, 8.Nace Frelih, 9.Urban Klavžar, 10.Dan Duščak, 11.Mark Filip Ivanković, 12.Žiga Daneu, 13.Robert Jurković, 14.Saša Ciani, 15.Staš Sivka (Coach: Peter Markovinovič)

See also
 Slovenia national basketball team
 Slovenia men's national under-19 basketball team
 Slovenia men's national under-17 basketball team

References

External links
Official website 
FIBA profile

Slovenia national basketball team
Men's national under-20 basketball teams